Typhoon Megi, known in the Philippines as Super Typhoon Juan, was the strongest tropical cyclone of 2010 and is considered one of the most intense ever recorded. Megi, which means catfish in Korean (Hangul: 메기), was the only super typhoon in 2010. Early on October 18, Megi made its first landfall over Luzon. By passing Luzon, Megi weakened but gradually regained strength in the South China Sea, before weakening and losing its eye in the Taiwan Strait. Megi made its second landfall over Zhangpu in Fujian, China on October 23.

Megi killed 31 people and caused $255.1 million (2010 USD) in damage over Luzon, making it top twenty of the costliest typhoons in the Philippines. After moving to the South China Sea, the outflow of Megi and a weather front together brought torrential rainfall, caused $42.2 million (2010 USD) in damage and killed 38 people in Yilan, Taiwan, making Megi the deadliest typhoon of 2010s in Taiwan. Megi also caused $411.7 million (2010 USD) in damage over Fujian, China, although there were no deaths by the storm in the province.

Meteorological history

Late on October 10, a tropical disturbance formed east-southeast of Guam. There were favorable environmental conditions, such as low vertical wind shear, good upper-level divergence and poleward outflow. The system began to significantly develop on October 12, prompting the Joint Typhoon Warning Center (JTWC) issuing a Tropical Cyclone Formation Alert at 09:00 UTC. Several hours later, the Japan Meteorological Agency (JMA) began monitoring the system as a tropical depression. Early on October 13, JTWC also classified the system as a tropical depression and designated it 15W.

Hours later, well-defined convective banding features developed around the system and thunderstorm activity over the center of circulation increased. Sea surface temperature above  and high oceanic heat content allowed for further strengthening. Situated to the southwest of a subtropical ridge, the system slowly tracked west-northwest towards the Philippines. Around 12:00 UTC, the system further intensified into a tropical storm, earning the name Megi from JMA.

Late on October 13, Tropical Storm Megi became quasi-stationary, but a mid-latitude trough moving from the west caused the storm to resume a northwestward track around the periphery of the subtropical ridge. Throughout the morning of October 14, a central dense overcast developed over the center of Megi, allowing for intensification. Later that day, a microwave scanned the developing eye of Megi, resulting in JMA upgrading the system to a severe tropical storm and JTWC upgrading it to a typhoon. On October 15, JMA upgraded Megi to a typhoon, and the Philippine Atmospheric, Geophysical and Astronomical Services Administration (PAGASA) began to mention the typhoon and named it Juan as it entered the Philippine Area of Responsibility, with improved outflow over the western semi-circle and a well-defined low-level circulation center with tightly curved banding. On October 16, Megi began rapid deepening with a well-defined eye due to enhanced poleward outflow by a transitory mid-latitude trough.

Early on October 17, Megi started to moved westward and then west-southwestward because of the subtropical ridge. By the warm waters, impressive convection and a circular  diameter eye, JTWC upgraded Megi to a super typhoon with category 5 strength on the Saffir–Simpson hurricane wind scale, becoming the only super typhoon in 2010 and the first since Nida in 2009. Late on October 17, Megi developed a well-defined  diameter eye with a concentric eyewall and excellent radial outflow. According to RSMC Best Track Data, Megi attained the highest 10-minute maximum sustained winds at  since Bess in 1982 and the lowest atmospheric pressure at  since Vanessa in 1984 in the Northwest Pacific Ocean at 18:00 UTC and 00:00 UTC on the next day.

Maintaining peak intensity, Typhoon Megi made landfall over Isabela, Philippines at 03:25 UTC (11:25 PST) on October 18. When passing the Sierra Madre, the eye filled due to land interaction, but tightly curved banding and excellent radial outflow remained. The weakened typhoon arrived at the South China Sea late on October 18, and it began to reorganize. On October 19, Megi formed an enlarged but ragged eye. Late on the same day, Megi turned northwestward and moved slowly due to the significantly weakening western subtropical ridge in response to a deepening mid-latitude shortwave trough moving into Southeast China.

Typhoon Megi turned northward then north-northeastward towards a break in the subtropical ridge caused by an approaching mid-latitude trough on October 20. By low vertical wind shear and good radial outflow especially on the poleward channel, the typhoon started to gradually intensify.

On October 22, the eye of Typhoon Megi became cloud-filled and convection has begun erode due to increasing vertical wind shear. Late on the same day, JMA downgraded Megi to a severe tropical storm in the Taiwan Strait because of subsidence induced by a developing upper-level trough west of the storm. On October 23, Megi made landfall over Zhangpu in Fujian, China at 04:55 UTC. Soon, Megi weakened to a tropical storm in mainland China, as the majority of convection associated with the system has dissipated, prompting JTWC issuing a final warning. Megi further weakened to a tropical depression late on October 23. On October 24, the tropical depression dissipated completely around 12:00 UTC, though according to the JTWC Best Track Data analysis, Megi became extratropical at 00:00 UTC on the next day.

Preparations

Philippines

The typhoon entered the Philippine Area of Responsibility early on October 16, prompting new and modified warnings for the Luzon coast. There was the expectation that the typhoon would become a super-typhoon and produce as much rain as Typhoon Ketsana in 2009, with the possibility of Magat Dam being filled. As Typhoon Megi neared Luzon, the Philippine National Red Cross established centers for evacuees fleeing the typhoon.

In response to orders from President Benigno Aquino III, PAGASA posted hourly tropical cyclone updates. Inhabitants of the Isabela and Cagayan provinces were advised to bring in their harvests before Megi arrived, while fishermen in the Ilocos region were advised to seek shelter. Late on October 16, PAGASA issued Storm Signal 1 for Cagayan, Isabela, Babuyan and Calayan islands in the northern Philippines, while President Aquino called for cooperation from all concerned government and private sector groups to prevent fatalities.

On October 17, evacuations began with hundreds of people fleeing from Luzon as Megi intensified into a super typhoon and Storm signal number 3 raised. Over 18 provinces had been placed under alert for the typhoon as it approached the Philippines. Later on that day, all state schools and colleges were suspended. PAGASA declared public storm warning number 4 announcing that over 7 million people were liable to be affected. The storm warning was later raised to the highest level over Cagayan and Isabela as tropical storm force winds began blowing throughout Cagayan province.

By October 18, all state schools and colleges in Cagayan, the Ilocos and the Cordilleras were closed for the day in preparation. Isabela province was placed under a state of calamity when the typhoon made landfall and moved further inland.

Highest Public Storm Warning Signal

Mainland China

China began preparing for Super Typhoon Megi on October 17 by issuing an orange alert to local authorities and advising all vessels to return to port. Evacuation of coastal residents began on October 18 as authorities issued disaster warnings and urgent advice to local officials in Hainan, Guangxi, Guangdong and Fujian provinces to prepare for relief operations. The government ordered all fishing vessels to return to port by midnight on October 19 as Typhoon Megi entered the South China Sea. The following day, China railways suspended all trains in and out of Hainan in preparation for Typhoon Megi. Equipment used in relief operations from heavy rains the previous month were kept in preparation for Typhoon Megi. As the typhoon approached, over 150,000 residents from coastal areas of Fujian province were evacuated and tens of thousands of fishing vessels were ordered to seek shelter in port. Warnings were also issued to prepare for storm surges when the typhoon arrives. Rail services to and from Hainan Island were resumed while tonnes of food and other supplies were brought in for disaster relief.

Hong Kong
In response to Megi's approach, the Hong Kong Observatory issued Standby Signal No. 1 at 16:35 HKT (08:35 UTC) on October 20. The Government had already informed the Travel Industry council and the Hong Kong International Airport to make plans in case of passengers being stranded at the airport. The Observatory subsequently issued Strong Wind Signal No. 3 at 05:40 HKT (21:40 UTC) on October 21 (October 20 UTC).
As of 8:40 pm on October 22 all Signals were cancelled by the Hong Kong Observatory.

Macau
The Macao Meteorological and Geophysical Bureau (SMG) hoisted the Standby Signal No. 1 at 19:00 HKT(11:00 UTC) on October 19, 2010.

Impact and aftermath

Philippines
The centre of the storm made landfall near Divalacan Bay, Luzon, at 11:25 am (local time) on October 18 preceded by torrential rain and flash flooding forcing residents of the area to seek shelter. A reported total of 3,687 individuals from the northern Philippines were evacuated to schools, churches, halls and other sturdier structures but over 200,000 people were rendered homeless.  Although at little risk of being struck by the departing typhoon, classes throughout Metro Manila were suspended on October 19 as a precaution.

Initial estimates suggested that Philippine rice farmers could lose over 600,000 metric tons of crops as the typhoon swept through some of the biggest agricultural areas, such as Isabela and Cagayan, in the northern Philippines. Official estimates following the passing of the typhoon placed agricultural losses at around US$34 million with tens of thousands of tons of rice and corn lost. Fears of a rice shortage in the next few weeks were allayed by the National Food Authority which announced that sufficient food had been stockpiled.

Megi inflicted substantial damage to much of the infrastructure as it crossed Luzon. Communication infrastructure in Cagayan and Isabela suffered extensive damage during the typhoon with an estimated 90% of regional communications lost. Officials believe that it would take five days to restore them. Electricity in the northern provinces of Cagayan, Kalinga, Apayao, Northern Isabela, the Mountain Province, parts of Benguet, Ilocos Norte, la Union, Nueva Ecija, Aurora, parts of Tuguegarao was disrupted by Megi. The National Grid Corp. announced that eleven towers along one transmission line suffered extensive damage, which also affected power supplies to the capital leading to outages of up to 3 hours.

Many domestic and international flights by carriers such as Cebu Pacific and Philippine Airlines bound for the northern Philippines were cancelled because of the impact of the typhoon, but as the typhoon left the islands, many flights were restored. Many roads in Luzon remained closed through October 18, and bus operators cancelled trips to Cagayan and Isabela due to the poor weather. The departure of Megi left large quantities of debris, as well as unsanitary conditions.

The Philippine Red Cross dispatched a water search and rescue team to Cagayan to aid rescue operations. UNICEF announced that the organisation was monitoring the event and that relief supplies were being prepared should the Philippines Government request aid. The United Nations Office for the Coordination on Humanitarian Affairs have also committed to helping with disaster relief. Reserve military officers, volunteers, and helicopters were on standby in preparation for the storm, with one retired army general describing the operations as "preparing for war". Search and rescue operations for survivors was hampered by winds that were still reaching  throughout the region. According to official reports, the province of Isabela bore the brunt of the storm with the towns of Palanan and Divilacan suffering extensive damage and Maconacon reportedly being completely destroyed.

PAGASA lowered storm signals as the typhoon weakened when it crossed into the mountains in northern Luzon.

Casualties
One person drowned near Tuguegarao, Cagayan during the afternoon of October 18 after being swept away in a river that had overflowed its banks. The body of another man who had drowned in Ilocos Sur province was recovered. Another five people died during the storm: one man after being pinned by a falling tree, a mother and her two children when a tree fell on their house and a fifth when struck by lightning. Three people were killed in Isabela province by a storm surge while another drowned attempting to cross a river in Nueva Ecija province. A further nine people have been injured, some by falling debris. The president made a statement expressing his sympathy and condolences for the bereft families, while also declaring that despite the strength of Megi, the loss of life was significantly less than during Typhoon Basyang and Tropical Storm Ondoy. As of October 20, the death toll stood at 19.

Juan became the second super typhoon to hit the area, 21 years after the first such storm, Super Typhoon Tasing of 1989.

Relief efforts
Child United, a Seattle-based non-profit which provides disaster relief in Asia, was on standby to provide assistance to families left homeless by the typhoon. Their relief operation began October 18 in the Philippines, with supplies already in-country being prepared for immediate delivery to the disaster site, and additional supplies prepared for shipment from the United States. The organization collected monetary donations to assist in further disaster relief, as well as donations of towels, sheets, toiletries (shampoo, toothpaste, etc.) and canned goods.

The USS Essex Expeditionary Strike Group (ESG) provided disaster relief in the aftermath. The ESG was composed of the USS Essex (LHD 2), USS Denver (LPD 9) and USS Harpers Ferry (LSD 49). Amphibious Squadron 11 and the 31st Marine Expeditionary Unit with Marine Medium Helicopter Squadron 262 (HMM-262) were embarked with the ESG. Marine Medium Helicopter Squadron 265 (HMM-265) also provided disaster relief. The unit was ashore at Clark International Airport participating in an exercise when the typhoon hit. Their mission changed from participation in the exercise to disaster relief.

Juan as a typhoon name was retired by PAGASA, and replaced with Jose, as the typhoon reached the damage cost threshold of ₱1 billion. However, Jose has also been retired and replaced by Josie as it too caused in excess of ₱1 billion worth of damage.

Taiwan
According to the Central Weather Bureau, a record  of rain fell in a 24‑hour span between October 20 and 21. This surpassed the previous record set by Typhoon Morakot in August 2009, just over a year prior. In Suao, a record  of rain fell within an hour, triggering some of the worst flash flooding in the area in over 20 years. Megi also brought much rainfall in Hualien, Taitung, Pingtung, Taipei, Keelung, and New Taipei. At least 12 people have been confirmed dead and 23 others are missing. Early damage estimates placed losses to agriculture at NT$45 million (US$1.5 million). Later reports on October 22 indicated that seven people were killed when the temple they were sheltering in was buried by a landslide. Near Suao, multiple landslides struck a major highway stranding more than 400 people. Torrential rainfall caused a  section of a nearby mountain to collapse, burying a bus carrying 19 people, whom officials fear may have all perished. Air force helicopters have been called in to aid in the search for the bus and any survivors.

By the morning of October 24, 13 fatalities had been confirmed and 25 people were reported missing. After more than ten days of search-and-rescue operations, all missing persons across the island were declared legally deceased.

Mainland China
After brushing Taiwan, Typhoon Megi struck southern China as a severe tropical storm. Throughout Fujian Province, an estimated 729,800 people were affected by the storm. A total of 36,050 hectares of crops and 530 houses were destroyed by the storm with overall losses incurred in Fujian Province reaching 2.8 billion yuan (US$411.7 million).

Records
The Hong Kong Observatory analysed that Megi was the strongest tropical cyclone in the Northwest Pacific Ocean since Tip in 1979 by attaining the 10-minute maximum sustained winds at 270 km/h (145 knots, 165 mph). A hurricane hunter aircraft indicated 1-minute maximum sustained surface winds of  before peak intensity, which was equivalent to Tip in 1979.

When reaching peak intensity at 18:00 UTC on October 17 and 00:00 UTC on October 18, Megi's Current Intensity (CI) number of the Dvorak technique was 8.0, the highest number. According to JMA's advisory, Megi still maintained its peak strength at 03:00 UTC on October 18, making it one of the strongest tropical cyclones to make landfall on record at 03:25 UTC. Moreover, Megi was the latest-forming storm to make landfall over Fujian, China since 1949.

See also

Typhoon Chanchu (Caloy, 2006)
Typhoon Hagupit (Ruby, 2014)
Other notable tropical cyclones that struck the Philippines
Typhoon Angela (Rosing, 1995)
Typhoon Fengshen (Frank, 2008)
Typhoon Parma (Pepeng, 2009)
Typhoon Nesat (Pedring, 2011)
Typhoon Bopha (Pablo, 2012)
Typhoon Haima (Lawin, 2016)
Typhoon Mangkhut (Ompong, 2018)
Typhoon Yutu (Rosita, 2018)
Other strong tropical cyclones
Typhoon Tip (Warling, 1979)
Hurricane Wilma (2005)
Typhoon Haiyan (Yolanda, 2013)
Hurricane Patricia (2015)
Typhoon Meranti (Ferdie, 2016)

References

External links
RSMC Tokyo – Typhoon Center
Best Track Data of Typhoon Megi (1013) 
Best Track Data (Graphics) of Typhoon Megi (1013)
Best Track Data (Text)
JTWC Best Track Data of Super Typhoon 15W (Megi)
15W.MEGI from the U.S. Naval Research Laboratory

Hurricane Research Division of AOML/NOAA – Megi (WPac) 2010
ITOP 2010 Research – Vortex_message.txt on October 14, 16 and 17, 2010

2010 Pacific typhoon season
Typhoons in China
Typhoons in Taiwan
2010 disasters in the Philippines
Typhoons in the Philippines
Typhoons
Articles containing video clips
Megi